Tari Urban LLG a local-level government (LLG) of Tari-Pori District in Hela Province, Papua New Guinea.

Wards
01. Piribu
02. Paipali / Piribu 2
03. Kikita 1
04. Kikita 2
06. Kupari
07. Yulubate/Tari 1
08. Tari 2 / 3
09. Pai
80. Tari Urban (4)

See also 
Tari, Papua New Guinea (town)

References 

Local-level governments of Hela Province